William Price (born 22 April 2000) is an English actor, known for portraying the role of Sid Sumner in the Channel 4 soap opera, Hollyoaks. Prior to joining Hollyoaks, Price appeared in various theatre productions including Goodnight Mister Tom and To Kill a Mockingbird. For his role as Sid, he was nominated for a National Television Award for Serial Drama Performance.

Early life
William Price was born on 22 April 2000 in Bishop's Stortford, Hertfordshire. He attended Northgate End primary school and the Bishop's Stortford High School. He has stated that his first interest in acting was when he was 10, and saw a production of Billy Elliot the Musical; he turned to his mother and stated that he wanted to pursue acting, and signed up for an audition for an acting school on the way out. Until the age of 18, Price competed in cricket and rugby tournaments, but chose to pursue acting as a career.

Career
Price made his professional acting debut in 2012, in a production of Peter Pan as Lost Boy. He then appeared in various West End theatre productions, such as Goodnight Mister Tom in 2012, where he played the role of Zach. He also starred in a touring production of To Kill a Mocking Bird as Jem from 2014 to 2015. Price has stated that this production "set in stone" the idea that he wanted to be an actor, and that it helped to "sculpt" his acting skills. From 2018 to 2019, Price appeared in the Nickelodeon comedy series SHHH! as Jack. He also starred in the award-winning short film Patsy. Later that year, he was cast in the Channel 4 soap opera Hollyoaks as guest character Sid Sumner. Following his guest appearance, he auditioned for two roles on the BBC soap opera EastEnders; Hunter Owen and Bobby Beale. He explained that he made it "quite far" into the audition process, but other actors were chosen. Days later, his character on Hollyoaks was promoted to a series regular. In 2021, he received a shortlist nomination for Serial Drama Performance at the 26th National Television Awards for his portrayal of Sid. Price made the decision to leave Hollyoaks in 2022. Then in March 2023, he portrayed Kyle Mainwaring in an episode of the BBC soap opera Doctors.

Stage

Filmography

Awards and nominations

References

External links
 

2000 births
Living people
English male child actors
English male soap opera actors
Male actors from Hertfordshire